Sir Edgar Bertram Mackennal  (12 June 186310 October 1931), usually known as Bertram Mackennal, was an Australian sculptor and medallist, most famous for designing the coinage and stamps bearing the likeness of George V. He signed his work "BM".

He was one of the few artists that King George V liked, and, as a result, was selected to create many sculptures of the late king. Some of his more notable works include statues of George on display in Delhi and Madras.

Early life and family
Bertram Mackennal was born in Fitzroy, Victoria, a suburb of Melbourne, the second son of parents who were both of Scottish descent. His mother was Annabella,  Hyde, and his father was John Simpson Mackennal, a "prominent Melbourne artist and sculptor".  Bertram's brother Horace John Mackennal (died 28 June 1949) would go on to be a prominent architect who was responsible for the design of many large architectural projects in Victoria in his capacity as Commonwealth Works Director for Victoria (1912–1939).

John Mackennal provided Bertram his early training which was followed by studies at the school of design at the Melbourne National Gallery which he attended from 1878 to 1882. Marshall Wood, a visiting English sculptor, advised him to go Europe and promised employment. Mackennal left for London in 1882 to study at the National Gallery Schools, discovered Wood had died and shared a studio with Charles Douglas Richardson and Tom Roberts. In 1884 he visited Paris for further study and married a fellow student, Agnes Spooner.

Career

On returning to England, Mackennal was appointed head of modelling and design at the Coalport Potteries, Shropshire early in 1886. In the same year he won a competition for the sculptured reliefs on the front of Parliament House, Melbourne, and returned to Australia in 1887 to execute these.

While in Australia, Mackennal obtained other commissions, including the figure over the doorway of Mercantile Chambers, Collins Street, Melbourne. Mackennal also met the visiting Sarah Bernhardt who strongly advised him to leave Australia and return to Paris. Mackennal borrowed money from Frank Stuart and arrived in Paris in 1891. La Tete d'une Saint (Head of a Saint) 1892 was produced soon after his arrival in Paris.  Head of a Saint features a contemporary modern woman, with elaborate lilies.  The marble version of Head of a Saint was included in the Paris Salon of 1892, with a single bronze version known to also exist.  In 1892, the Argus reported that the 'relief in marble, for its size, is the best thing of its kind in the Salon.' In 1893 he had his first success when his full-length figure "Circe", now at the National Gallery of Victoria, obtained a "mention" at the Old Salon and created a good deal of interest. It was exhibited later at the Royal Academy of Arts where it also aroused great interest, partly because of the prudery of the hanging committee which insisted that the base should be covered. He was the first Australian to exhibit at the Royal Academy. Commissions began flowing in, among them being the figures "Oceana" and "Grief" for the Union Club, Sydney. Two Melbourne commissions brought him to Australia again in 1901: the memorial to Sir William Clarke, 1st Baronet at the Treasury Gardens, Melbourne, and the sculptures for the Springthorpe Memorial in Kew.

Mackennal returned to London, and among his works of this period were the fine pediment for the local government board office at Westminster, a Boer War memorial for Islington, and statues of Queen Victoria for Ballarat, Lahore, and Blackburn. In 1907 his marble group "The Earth and the Elements" was purchased for the National Gallery of British Art under the Chantrey Bequest, and in 1908 his "Diana Wounded" was also bought for the nation. This dual success brought Mackennal into great prominence, and he was elected an associate of the Royal Academy in 1909, the first Australian accorded this honour. He also designed the medals for the 1908 London Olympic Games.

In 1910 Mackennal designed the Coronation Medal for King George V and also won the important commission for the obverse design (the monarch's head) of the new coinage needed for the new reign from 1911, from which he developed the new design for the King's head on British postage stamps. This is certainly his most enduring design. His initials, B.M., can be seen on the truncation of the King's neck on the obverse of all British coins of George V. His next important work was the memorial to Thomas Gainsborough at Sudbury, which was followed by the memorial tomb of King Edward VII at St. George's Chapel, Windsor. Mackennal also sculpted statues of King Edward VII for London, Melbourne, Calcutta and Adelaide.

Mackennal was the first Australian artist to be knighted. He was created a Knight Commander of the Victorian Order in 1921 by H.M. King George V on the occasion of the unveiling of the London equestrian statue of King Edward VII. He was elected R.A. in 1922.

Late life
Among Mackennal's later works were the nude male figure for the Eton War Memorial, the Parliamentary War Memorial to the members of both houses of parliament in London, the figures of the soldier and the sailor for the cenotaph in Martin Place, Sydney, the bronze statue of King George V at Old Parliament House, Canberra, and the head of "Victory", presented to the Commonwealth by the artist, also at Canberra. He completed the Desert Mounted Corps memorial at the Suez Canal from the designs of Charles Web Gilbert a little while before his death. Sir Bertram Mackennal died suddenly from rupture of abdominal aneurysm at his house, Watcombe Hall, near Torquay, Devon on 10 October 1931; he was survived by Lady Mackennal and a daughter.

Selected works

 Five Foolish Virgins, relief, (exhibited 1886)
 Sculptured reliefs, Parliament House, Melbourne (installed 1887)
 Louis Buvelot, bust, National Gallery of Victoria (1892)
 Head of a Saint, (1892), marble bust, exhibited at Paris Salon (1892), single bronze relief also in existence from 1892. https://web.archive.org/web/20161027055328/http://postimg.org/image/yla0thbq3/
 Circe, bronze figure, National Gallery of Victoria (exhibited 1893)
 Sarah Bernhardt, bust (1893), exhibited at the Paris Salon of (1894)
 Truth, bronze statuette, Art Gallery of New South Wales (1894)
 For She Sitteth on a Seat in the High Places of the City (Rahab), location unknown, (exhibited 1895)
 Figure over doorway, Mercantile Chambers, Collins Street, Melbourne
 Pediment, New Government Offices, Whitehall, Westminster, London (1898)
 Dame Nellie Melba, bust, Royal Opera House, Covent Garden, London (1899)
 Queen Victoria, seated bronze, the British Embassy gardens, Bangkok (1900)
 Queen Victoria, statues, Ballarat, Lahore and Blackburn (c.1901)
 Oceania, Union, University & Schools Club, Sydney
 Springthorpe Memorial, sculptures, Boroondara General Cemetery, Kew, (1901)
 Sir William John Clarke, Treasury Gardens, Melbourne (1901)
 Boer War Memorial, (Victory), entrance to Highbury Fields, Islington (1903)
 The Dancer, bronze life-size statue, Art Gallery of New South Wales (1904)
 War (Bellona or Victory), Sculpture Garden, Australian War Memorial, Canberra (sculpted 1906)
 Memorial to Sir Peter Nicol Russell, East Finchley Cemetery, London and University of Sydney (1906–09)
 The Earth and the Elements (marble group), Tate Gallery (exhibited 1907)
 Sir William Howard Russell, bust, The Crypt, St Paul's Cathedral, London (1907)
 Olympic Games Medals, London, 1908
 Diana Wounded, bronze, Tate Gallery (purchased 1908)
 King George V coinage and medals (signed BM) and postage stamps (1910)
 Tomb for Edward VII (with Edward Lutyens), St George's Chapel at Windsor Castle (commissioned 1910)
 National Memorial to Thomas Gainsborough, Sudbury, Suffolk
 Apollo, Taplow Court, Buckinghamshire.
 King George V, marble portrait statue, formerly situated at the Flower Bazaar Police Station, Madras, now at the Rashtrapati Bhavan, New Delhi (1916)
 King Edward VII, bronze equestrian statue mounted on archway, Victoria Memorial Hall, Calcutta (1916)
 King Edward VII, bronze equestrian statue, Queen Victoria Gardens, Melbourne (unveiled 1920)
 King Edward VII, bronze statue (and associated figures), Adelaide (unveiled 1920)
 King Edward VII, bronze equestrian statue, Waterloo Place London (1921)
 Parliamentary War Memorial, London
 War Memorial, Corporation Park, Blackburn, Lancashire (1922)
 War Memorial, Cliveden House, Buckinghamshire, England
 War Memorial for Eton College, (now at National Gallery of Victoria) (1923)
 Phoebus Driving the Horses of the Sun, Australia House, The Strand, London, (installed 1923)
 1914–1918 War Memorial Mother Courage, Caledonian Club, Belgravia, London (unveiled 1923 by Vice President, Field Marshal Earl Haig, with Sir Bertram in attendance.)
 Cardinal Moran and Archbishop Kelly, St Mary's Cathedral, Sydney
 Shakespeare Memorial, Shakespeare Place, Sydney (1926)
 The Cenotaph, Martin Place, Sydney (1929)
 Mary Curzon, Baroness Curzon of Kedleston, tomb effigy at All Saints' church, Kedleston, Derbyshire (1913)
 George Curzon, 1st Marquess Curzon of Kedleston, monument, All Saints' church, Kedleston (1931)
 Marquess Curzon, statue, Carlton House Terrace, London
 Desert Mounted Corps Memorial, Port Said (1931) (now at Mount Clarence, Albany, Western Australia)

See also
 Visual arts of Australia

References

External links

Profile on Royal Academy of Arts Collections
Bertrand Mackennal at the Art Gallery of New South Wales
Mackennals war sculptures in Australia
The Victoria Web: Sir Edgar Bertram Mackennal
A&A art and architecture: Mackennal, Edgar Bertram
Review of exhibition at the National Gallery of Victoria 2008 by Tony Lloyd

1863 births
1931 deaths
Australian people of Scottish descent
20th-century Australian sculptors
Australian Knights Commander of the Royal Victorian Order
Currency designers
Australian stamp designers
Australian designers
Symbolist sculptors
Royal Academicians
19th-century Australian sculptors
Coin designers
People from Fitzroy, Victoria
National Gallery of Victoria Art School alumni